Petite Sans Culotte was a French Navy tartane that the French Navy acquired at Toulon in July 1793, and armed with two 6-pounder guns. The British captured her in August at the Siege of Toulon. Morgan had been a midshipman on Victory and on his promotion to 8th Lieutenant of Victory, was immediately transferred to Petite Sans Culotte. He brought with him as crew 10 men from Victory. Consequently, the British renamed her Petite Victoire.  

Petite Victoire served against the batteries surrounding the city and performed useful services during the evacuation of Toulon on 18 December. She apparently was not abandoned to be captured.

Fate
She was lost off Cap Corse. In a journal entry and two letters dated 16 March 1794, Lord Nelson mentions that Petite Victoire "having started a plank was obliged to run on shore, and is hauled up", and "Petite Victoire – hauled on shore at Erbalonga". Erbalunga is a fishing village on Cape Corse, the site of Tour d'Erbalunga, and some five miles north of Bastia. Nelson also reports that his carpenter had looked at Petite Victoire; the carpenter reported that she was so damaged as not to be worth repairing. Nelson remarks that the officer commanding her was not at fault as the gale that resulted in his grounding her was strong.

Confusion as to origins and naming
Petite Sans Cullote was amongst the most minor of vessels, acquired and lost during a turbulent period; it is no surprise that her history is obscure. One source suggests that Petite Victoire was the former Brave Sans Cullote. However, Demerliac lists Petite Victoire as a separate ship, a 2-gun brig in service in Toulon in July 1793, origin and measurements unknown, that the British captured and that was lost off Cape Corse).

Citations and references
Citations

References
 
Nelson, Horatio Nelson (Viscount), Sir Nicholas Harris Nicolas (1845) The Dispatches and Letters of Vice Admiral Lord Viscount Nelson: 1777 to 1794. (H. Colburn).
 

1790s ships
Ships of the French Navy
Captured ships
Ships of the Royal Navy
Maritime incidents in 1793